Nihad Mujakić (born 15 April 1998) is a Bosnian professional footballer who plays as a centre-back for Turkish Süper Lig club Ankaragücü.

Club career

Sarajevo
Mujakić came through youth academy of his hometown club Sarajevo. He signed his first professional contract in September 2015. He made his professional debut against Zrinjski Mostar on 31 July 2016 at the age of 18.

In June 2018, Mujakić signed a new five-year contract with Sarajevo.

On 19 July 2018, he scored his first professional goal in UEFA Europa League qualifier against Banants.

Mujakić won his first trophy with the club on 15 May 2019, by beating Široki Brijeg in Bosnian Cup final.

Kortrijk
On 21 January 2019, Belgian outfit Kortrijk announced that Mujakić would join them at the end of season for an undisclosed transfer fee. He made his competitive debut for the club on 20 September against Mechelen.

In January 2020, he was loaned to Croatian team Hajduk Split until June 2021.

On 11 August 2021, he joined Waasland-Beveren on a season-long loan.

Return to Sarajevo
On 22 January 2022, Mujakić returned to Sarajevo and signed a 2.5-year contract.

International career
Mujakić represented Bosnia and Herzegovina on various youth levels.

Career statistics

Club

Honours
Sarajevo
Bosnian Premier League: 2018–19
Bosnian Cup: 2018–19

References

External links

1998 births
Living people
Footballers from Sarajevo
Bosniaks of Bosnia and Herzegovina
Bosnia and Herzegovina Muslims
Bosnia and Herzegovina footballers
Bosnia and Herzegovina youth international footballers
Bosnia and Herzegovina under-21 international footballers
Bosnia and Herzegovina expatriate footballers
Association football central defenders
FK Sarajevo players
K.V. Kortrijk players
HNK Hajduk Split players
S.K. Beveren players
MKE Ankaragücü footballers
Premier League of Bosnia and Herzegovina players
Belgian Pro League players
Croatian Football League players
Challenger Pro League players
Süper Lig players
Expatriate footballers in Belgium
Expatriate footballers in Croatia
Expatriate footballers in Turkey
Bosnia and Herzegovina expatriate sportspeople in Belgium
Bosnia and Herzegovina expatriate sportspeople in Croatia
Bosnia and Herzegovina expatriate sportspeople in Turkey